"Make It Easy on Yourself" is a popular song written by Burt Bacharach and Hal David which was first a hit for Jerry Butler in 1962.  The best known version is the 1965 recording by the Walker Brothers for whom it was a No. 1 UK hit.  Dionne Warwick, who made a demo of this song in early 1962, later had a hit with the song in 1970.

Jerry Butler
Chicago-based Vee-Jay Records head A&R man Calvin Carter brought back "Make It Easy on Yourself" from a trip to New York City scouting song publishers. Carter played the demo, featuring Dionne Warwick's vocal, for Vee-Jay artist Jerry Butler who commented: "Man, it's a great song, and the girl who's singing it, and the arrangement, is a hit." When Carter explained that Florence Greenberg, the owner of Scepter Records who'd recently signed Warwick, was not interested in "Make It Easy on Yourself" Butler recalls being "ecstatic" and, wanting the same arrangement featured on the demo flew to New York City to record the song in a session overseen by Burt Bacharach (although Bacharach's official credit was limited to arranger). "Make It Easy on Yourself" was released in June 1962 to reach No. 20 on the Billboard Hot 100 that August; the track's R&B chart peak was No. 18.

The Walker Brothers

The most successful pop version of "Make It Easy on Yourself" was the 1965 single by the Walker Brothers which reached No. 16 on the Hot 100 that December; this version had been a No. 1 hit in the UK in September 1965. The song appeared as the opening song on the group's début studio album Take It Easy with the Walker Brothers and as the opening song on side 2 of their début US album Introducing the Walker Brothers.

Although based in London, the Walker Brothers were familiar with the original 1962 hit by Jerry Butler (which had been overlooked in its concurrent UK release) and group member John Maus suggested that the Walker Brothers make a recording of "Make It Easy on Yourself". The track was recorded in a June 1965 session at the Philips studios in Marble Arch arranged by Ivor Raymonde who conducted his orchestra with production credited to Philips' head of A&R Johnny Franz; session personnel included Vic Flick and Big Jim Sullivan on guitars and Ronnie Verrell on drums.

The song was done in the style of Phil Spector's "Wall of Sound", which included a wordless chorus. This version ended with a long cadence chord in the orchestra, while the Butler version ended in a fade out during the Coda.

The single was backed with "But I Do" in most territories. In the US Smash Records released a second pressing of the single in October 1965 with Scott Walker's debut composition "Doin' the Jerk" as the b-side. The uptempo novelty dance track had already appeared as the b-side to the group's debut single; "Pretty Girls Everywhere".

In 2001 the Walker Brothers' "Make It Easy On Yourself" was sampled extensively by the Northern Irish band, Ash, on their single "Candy".

Track listing

Chart history

Dionne Warwick

Dionne Warwick's session work on the Drifters' track "Mexican Divorce" - recorded February 1962 – brought her to the attention of Burt Bacharach who subsequently had Warwick regularly provide vocals on demos of his songs beginning with "Make It Easy on Yourself". On the strength of her vocals on another demo: that of "It's Love That Really Counts", Warwick was signed by Florence Greenberg of Scepter Records although Greenberg gave the last-named song to the Shirelles as a B-side while rejecting "Make It Easy on Yourself" altogether leading to that song's being shopped to Jerry Butler. Warwick had assumed "Make It Easy on Yourself" would serve as her own debut single; on learning from Bacharach and co-composer Hal David that Jerry Butler was recording the song a keenly disappointed Warwick dismissed the composers' assurance of providing her with an equally potent song with the words: "Don't make me over, man" - i.e. "Don't con me". Bacharach and David in fact utilized Warwick's pessimistic response (with a shift in meaning) as the title for "Don't Make Me Over" the song which would indeed launch Warwick's hitmaking career.

Warwick's demo version of "Make It Easy on Yourself" was featured as an album track on Warwick's 1963 debut album Presenting Dionne Warwick but the track which became a hit for her was a recording of a live performance featured in a concert which took place at the Garden State Arts Center in Holmdel NJ in the summer of 1970. As with Warwick's 1966 hit "Message to Michael" the non-involvement of Bacharach and David in the track (beyond writing the song) is evidenced in its producers credit reading "a Blue Jac Production", Blue Jac Productions being the name Bacharach/David and Warwick had incorporated under in 1962 (officially Blue Jac Productions rather than Warwick personally were signed to Scepter Records). Warwick's sole live track released as a single, "Make It Easy on Yourself" served as the advance single for Warwick's final album (of new material) for Scepter, the December 1970 release Very Dionne; the single charted that autumn with chief support from easy listening radio as indicated by its No. 2 peak on that format's chart making moderate crossover to Pop - at No. 37 the final Top 40 hit of the first phase of Warwick's career - and R&B (No. 26).

Track listing

Chart history

Other versions
In 1966, Cilla Black released a recording of the song on her second studio album Cilla Sings a Rainbow which was a Top 5 hit on the UK album chart.

The 1972 Johnny Mathis album Song Sung Blue - produced by Jerry Fuller - featured a version of "Make It Easy on Yourself"; issued as a single the track reached No. 16 on the U.S. Easy Listening chart and "bubbled under the Hot 100" with a No. 103 peak. In Canada, his version reached number two on the Adult Contemporary chart.  In the UK Mathis' Song Sung Blue album was released with the title Make It Easy on Yourself.

References

1962 singles
1965 singles
1970 singles
Jerry Butler songs
The Walker Brothers songs
UK Singles Chart number-one singles
RPM Top Singles number-one singles
Songs with lyrics by Hal David
Songs with music by Burt Bacharach
Dionne Warwick songs
1962 songs
Song recordings produced by Johnny Franz
Vee-Jay Records singles
Philips Records singles
Scepter Records singles
Smash Records singles
Song recordings with Wall of Sound arrangements